Alexander Quintanilla Urionabarrenetxea (born 2 July 1990) is a Spanish footballer who plays for Gimnàstic de Tarragona. Mainly a central defender, he can also play as a defensive midfielder.

Club career
Born in Bilbao, Biscay, Quintanilla finished his graduation with Danok Bat CF, on loan from Athletic Bilbao. In the 2009 summer he was loaned to Club Portugalete in Tercera División, making his senior debut for the club during the campaign.

In June 2010 Quintanilla returned to Athletic, being assigned to the reserves in Segunda División B. On 19 July 2011, after featuring regularly, he signed a one-year deal with fellow league team Deportivo Alavés.

On 10 July 2012 Quintanilla signed for another reserve team, Valencia CF Mestalla also in the third tier. He was called up to the first team by manager Mauricio Pellegrino for the pre-season, and was also an unused substitute in a 2–0 Copa del Rey away win against CA Osasuna on 11 December.

On 29 January 2014, Quintanilla signed a six-month contract with Barakaldo CF. He was an undisputed starter for the club during the following two seasons, contributing with three goals in 36 appearances in 2015–16.

On 22 July 2016, Quintanilla signed a two-year deal with Segunda División club UD Almería. He made his professional debut on 6 September, starting in a 0–2 Copa del Rey home loss against Rayo Vallecano.

Quintanilla's debut in the second level came on 21 September 2016, as he started and was sent off in a 0–4 away loss against UCAM Murcia CF. On 10 January 2017 he rescinded his contract, and moved to fellow league team CD Mirandés the following day.

Quintanilla returned to the Andalusians in June 2017, but still terminated his contract on 1 September. The following 31 January, he signed a two-and-a-half-year contract with Córdoba CF, still in the second division.

On 27 June 2019, after suffering relegation, Quintanilla left the Blanquiverdes after terminating his contract, and signed for third tier side UD Ibiza on 28 August. On 21 September 2020, he signed a one-year contract with Gimnàstic de Tarragona also in division three.

Personal life
Quintanilla's father, Txirri, was also a footballer and a defender. He too was groomed at Athletic.

References

External links

1990 births
Living people
Spanish footballers
Footballers from Bilbao
Association football defenders
Segunda División players
Segunda División B players
Tercera División players
Danok Bat CF players
Bilbao Athletic footballers
Club Portugalete players
Deportivo Alavés players
Valencia CF Mestalla footballers
Barakaldo CF footballers
UD Almería players
CD Mirandés footballers
Córdoba CF players
UD Ibiza players
Gimnàstic de Tarragona footballers
Athletic Bilbao footballers